In the 1810 English cricket season, William Ward made his top-class debut and The Bs were dismissed for a total of only 6.

Honours
 Most runs – William Lambert 396 (HS 132*)
 Most wickets – William Lambert 31

Events
 The Bs were bowled out for 6 in the second innings of their match against England at Lord's Old Ground on 14 June: the innings contained only three scoring strokes, with E. H. Budd unable to bat due to injury. This total of 6 remains the record for the lowest innings total in top-class cricket.
 The match in August between Captain Blagrave's XI and Colonel Byng's XI is the last known to have been played on Lord's Old Ground.
 An American visitor drew a sharp distinction between cricket as played in England and "our cricket", referring especially to the "old long low wicket" still used in America.
 The impact of the Napoleonic War had been felt by cricket since 1797, when inter-county matches simply ceased, and there had been a steady decline in both number and quality of major matches during the first decade of the 19th century until they became few and far between after 1810.  Nevertheless, the impact of this war was less severe than that of the Seven Years' War because of the existence this time of MCC and other well-organised clubs like Brighton and Montpelier. These clubs managed to co-ordinate cricket activities during the war emergency and, as it were, keep the game going. Only 7 top-class matches were recorded in 1810:
 29–31 May — Lord F Beauclerk's XI v E Bligh's XI @ Lord's Old Ground
 12–14 June — All-England v The Bs @ Lord's Old Ground
 19–21 June — All-England v Surrey @ Lord's Old Ground
 2–4 July — Over 38 v Under 38 @ Lord's Old Ground
 16–18 July — All-England v Surrey @ Lord's Old Ground
 24–25 July — Over 38 v Under 38 @ Lord's Old Ground
 13–15 August — Captain Blagrave's XI v Colonel Byng's XI @ Lord's Old Ground

Debutants
1810 debutants included:
 William Ward (MCC)
 John Bowyer (Surrey)
 James Sherman (Surrey)

References

Bibliography

Further reading
 
 
 
 

1810 in English cricket
English cricket seasons in the 19th century